The following list ranks countries by the share of population with access to financial services. Access to financial services is defined as the share of the adult population with an account ownership at a financial institution or with a mobile-money-service provider. The data for the ranking taken from the Global Financial Inclusion Database, which was compiled by the World Bank in partnership with Gallup from through surveys of more than 150,000 adults in over 140 countries. Funding for the project came from the Bill and Melinda Gates Foundation. Surveys were taken in 2011, 2014 and 2017.

Ranking

References 

access to financial services
Financial services by country